The Block Brochure: Welcome to the Soil 3 is the seventeenth studio album by the American rapper E-40. It was released on March 26, 2012, by Heavy on the Grind Entertainment and EMI. The album is the first part of The Block Brochure: Welcome to the Soil series, along with other parts, including The Block Brochure: Welcome to the Soil 1 and The Block Brochure: Welcome to the Soil 2. E-40 has released four albums into each pairs, including Revenue Retrievin': Day Shift (2010), Revenue Retrievin': Night Shift (2010), Revenue Retrievin': Overtime Shift (2011) and Revenue Retrievin': Graveyard Shift (2011). The album features guest appearances from the comedian Katt Williams and the American singer-songwriter Raheem DeVaughn, with the rappers Snoop Dogg, Tha Dogg Pound, Kokane, Kendrick Lamar, Droop-E, Too Short, Kaveo, Stressmatic, B-Legit, Willy Will and Hieroglyphics, among others.

Promotion 
The music video for "Be You" featuring Too Short and J Banks, was released on March 29, 2012. The music video for "What Happened to Them Days" was released on April 5, 2012. The music video for "Catch a Fade" featuring Kendrick Lamar and Droop-E, was released on May 14, 2012. The music video for "What You Smokin' On" featuring Snoop Dogg, Tha Dogg Pound and Kokane, was released on May 23, 2012. The music video for "Wasted" featuring Cousin Fik, was released on August 7, 2012.

Commercial performance 

In March 2012, two commercials were released to promote The Block Brochure: Welcome to the Soil series. The third volume scored 76/100 on Metacritic, indicating "generally positive reviews". The Block Brochure: Welcome to the Soil 3 debuted at number 71 on the US Billboard 200, and number 13 on the US Billboard Top R&B/Hip-Hop Albums.

Track listing

Notes
 "It's Curtains" features an uncredited vocals by Cousin Fik and Work Dirty.
 "Pussy Loud" features an uncredited vocals by Araja.
 "What Happened to Them Days" features an uncredited vocals by J Banks.
 "Get Ya Weight Up" features an uncredited vocals by Turf Talk.

Sample credits
 "What You Smokin' On" contains a sample of "I Love Him" performed by Jean Plum.
 "40 & Hiero" contains a sample of "Here We Go (Live at the Funhouse)" performed by Run–D.M.C., and "La Di Da Di" performed by Doug E. Fresh and Slick Rick.

Charts

References

E-40 albums
2012 albums
Albums produced by Warren G
Albums produced by Rick Rock
Albums produced by Droop-E
EMI Records albums
Sequel albums
Albums produced by DJ Mustard